"Du bleibst immer noch du" ("You Still Remain Yourself") is a song by German singer Yvonne Catterfeld. The ballad was written by Catterfeld, A.C. Ademy, and Christoph Leis-Bendorff for Catterfeld's second studio album, Farben meiner Welt (2004), and produced by Leis-Bendorff.

Formats and track listings

Charts

References

External links
 YvonneCatterfeld.com – official website

2004 singles
2004 songs
Yvonne Catterfeld songs
Hansa Records singles